Mesolita pascoei is a species of beetle in the family Cerambycidae. It was described by van der Poll in 1892. It is known from Australia.

References

Parmenini
Beetles described in 1892